Ben Sears (born 11 February 1998) is a New Zealand cricketer. He made his international debut for the New Zealand cricket team in September 2021.

Career
He made his List A debut for Wellington in the 2018–19 Ford Trophy on 24 October 2018. Prior to his List A debut, he was named in New Zealand's squad for the 2016 Under-19 Cricket World Cup. He made his first-class debut for Wellington in the 2018–19 Plunket Shield season on 6 December 2018. He made his Twenty20 debut for Wellington in the 2018–19 Super Smash on 31 December 2018.

In June 2020, he was offered a contract by Wellington ahead of the 2020–21 domestic cricket season. In November 2020, Sears was named in the New Zealand A cricket team for practice matches against the touring West Indies team.

In August 2021, Sears was named in New Zealand's Twenty20 International (T20I) squads for their tour of Bangladesh, and their tour of Pakistan. Sears made his T20I debut on 3 September 2021, for New Zealand against Bangladesh.

In August 2022, Sears was named as a replacement for Matt Henry, who was ruled out of the West Indies tour due to rib injury.

References

External links
 

1998 births
Living people
New Zealand cricketers
New Zealand Twenty20 International cricketers
Wellington cricketers
Cricketers from Lower Hutt